McQuesten Airport  is located on the banks of the Stewart River near McQuesten, Yukon, Canada and receives no maintenance.

References

Registered aerodromes in Yukon